The Lower Silesian Voivodeship Sejmik is the regional legislature of the Voivodeship of Lower Silesia in Poland. It is a unicameral legislature consisting of thirty-six councillors chosen during local elections with a five-year term. The current chairperson of the assembly is Andrzej Jaroch.

The assembly elects the executive board that acts as the collective executive for the regional government, headed by the province's marshal. The current Executive Board of Lower Silesia is a coalition government between Law and Justice and the Independents. The current marshal is Cezary Przybylski.

The assembly convenes within the Voivodeship Office building in central Wrocław.

Districts 
Members of the Assembly are elected from five districts, serving five-year terms. Districts does not have the constituencies' formal names. Instead, each constituency has a number and territorial description.

Composition

1998

2002

2006

2010

2014

2018

See also 
 Polish Regional Assembly
 Lower Silesian Voivodeship

References

External links 
 Official website
 Executive board official website

Lower Silesian
Assembly
Unicameral legislatures